Yehoshua Ben-Zion (1924 – 2004) was an Israeli banker. He served as the managing director of Israel-British Bank. Following the collapse of the bank in July 1974, owing British investors £46.6 million, Ben-Zion was convicted of embezzling £20 million ($39.4 million) from the bank. He was sentenced to 12 years in prison. After urging of the Israeli prime minister Menachem Begin in 1977, Ben-Zion was pardoned by the Israeli president Ephraim Katzir, on medical grounds. He was released after serving three years.

Ben-Zion was born in Mandate Palestine and spent his childhood in the United States. He was a member of the Irgun and later became a colonel in the Israel Defense Forces. In 1972 he was a jurist in the trial of the women involved in the Sabena Flight 571 hijacking.

In 1973 he was the president of Lydda Military Court, with rank of major.

References

1924 births
2004 deaths
Irgun members
Israeli bankers
Israeli fraudsters
20th-century Israeli judges
Israeli prisoners and detainees
Prisoners and detainees of Israel
Recipients of Israeli presidential pardons
Mandatory Palestin expatriates in the United States